Minuartia recurva, the recurved sandwort or sickle-leaved sandwort, is a rare tufted, calcifugous chamaephyte perennial flowering plant in the family Caryophyllaceae. It blooms from late spring to the end of summer.

Description
The stems are wiry and lignified, with acicular leaves with three veins, curving to the side to a greater of lesser extent. The flowers are grouped in glandular flower-heads, the individual flowers being white and five-petaled. The inflorescence is a 1–8-flowered cyme.

Distribution
Minuartia recurva is found in mountainous regions of southern Europe and southwest Asia.

It is also found in Ireland's Caha Mountains, first noted there in 1964.

Gallery

References

Alpine flora
recurva
Flora of Europe
Plants described in 1907